Tarboro High School is a high school in Tarboro, North Carolina and is part of the Edgecombe County Public Schools district. It is one of four high schools in the district.

History
Tarboro High School was first established in 1881. Tarboro Colored School, which became known as W. A. Pattillo High School, served Tarboro's African American students. The schools merged and its teams integrated in 1970.

In the 1970s the school had a high number of suspensions, affecting the academic performance of students. To address the issue, it became one of the earliest schools in the North Carolina and Virginia area to use in-school suspension in place of the traditional out of school suspension.

Edgecombe County Public Schools was established in 1993.

In 1999, the school served as a temporary shelter for thousands of people affected by Hurricane Floyd. Vice President Al Gore was the commencement speaker for Tarboro High School's graduation ceremony in 2000. He praised the students for helping with the shelter during the aftermath of Hurricane Floyd, calling them "American heroes".

Athletics
The school has won 8 state football championships. In 2021, the football team won its fourth state championship in five seasons.

The boys' track and field team won back-to-back state championships in 1973 and 1974, led by coach Carter Ray Suggs.

Demographics
The demographic breakdown of the 551 students enrolled in the 2020-2021 school year was:
Black - 76.7%
Hispanic - 7.5%
White - 14.1%
Two or more races - 1.7%

Notable alumni
Kelvin BryantNFL running back and Super Bowl XXII champion with the Washington Redskins
Mike CaldwellMLB pitcher, member of Milwaukee Brewers Wall of Honor
Shaun DraughnNFL running back
Donald FrankNFL cornerback
Todd GurleyNFL running back, 3-time Pro Bowl selection and 2-time First-team All-Pro
Bill HullNFL defensive end
Tyquan LewisNFL defensive end

References

External links

Public high schools in North Carolina
Edgecombe County, North Carolina